Ariadna oreades, is a species of spider of the genus Ariadna. It is endemic to Sri Lanka.

See also
 List of Segestriidae species

References

Segestriidae
Endemic fauna of Sri Lanka
Spiders of Asia
Spiders described in 1906